The mutable sun squirrel (Heliosciurus mutabilis)  is a species of rodent in the family Sciuridae. It is found in Malawi, Mozambique, Tanzania, Zambia, and Zimbabwe. Its natural habitats are subtropical or tropical moist lowland forest, subtropical or tropical moist montane forest, moist savanna, and subtropical or tropical high-altitude grassland.

References

Heliosciurus
Rodents of Africa
Mammals described in 1852
Taxa named by Wilhelm Peters
Taxonomy articles created by Polbot